Aron Davydovych Baron (1891–1937) was a Ukrainian Jewish anarchist revolutionary. Following the suppression of the 1905 Revolution, he fled to the United States, where he met his wife Fanya Baron and participated in the local workers movement. With the outbreak of the 1917 Revolution, he returned to Ukraine, where he became a leading figure in the Nabat and in the Makhnovshchina. He was imprisoned by the Cheka for his anarchist activities and was executed during the Great Purge.

Biography
Aron Davydovych Baron was born into a Ukrainian Jewish family.

As a teenager, Baron became an anarchist and participated in the 1905 Russian Revolution, for which he was banished to Siberia as punishment. He fled to the United States, where he lived in Chicago. There he met and married Fanya Grefenson, also an anarchist revolutionary, and together they were arrested for starting a demonstration against unemployment. Following the February Revolution, Baron returned to Ukraine, where his lectures and writings grew in popularity and the Kyiv bakers' union elected him to represent them at the local Soviet. In the wake of the October Revolution, Baron moved to Kharkiv with Fanya, where they participated in the establishment of the Nabat, a confederation of anarchist organizations in Ukraine. He joined the confederation's secretariat and acted as co-editor of its journal, along with Volin.

By the summer of 1919, the Nabat had been forcibly dispersed by the Bolshevik government, which brought Baron and Volin to join the ranks of the Makhnovshchina, serving on its Cultural-Educational Commission and on the Military Revolutionary Council. At a Regional Congress, Baron spoke out against the Bolsheviks and declared the necessity to build a regime of free soviets, outside of party control. But before long, Baron had started to clash with Nestor Makhno and Dmitry Popov over the leadership of the movement, with the latter even threatening to have him killed. In September 1920, during an illegal conference of the Nabat in Kharkiv, Baron issued a resolution that was highly critical of the Makhnovshchina, declaring it "better to vanish into a Soviet prison than vegetate in that terrible atmosphere".

In November 1920, the leaders of the Nabat were arrested by the Cheka in Kharkiv, as part of Bolshevik operation against the Makhnovshchina. Aron and Fanya Baron were subsequently transferred to a prison in Moscow. In February 1921, Aron was briefly freed from prison in order to attend the funeral of Peter Kropotkin. In September 1921, Fanya was executed by the Cheka. Aron Baron spent the following 17 years in either prison or exile, before he was arrested and executed during the Great Purge.

References

Bibliography

Further reading

External links 
 
 

1891 births
1937 deaths
American anarchists
American people of Ukrainian-Jewish descent
Emigrants from the Russian Empire to the United States
Executed anarchists
Great Purge victims from Ukraine
Jewish anarchists
Jews executed by the Soviet Union
Makhnovshchina
People from Zhytomyr Oblast
People from Kiev Governorate
Soviet anarchists
Soviet rehabilitations
Ukrainian anarchists
Ukrainian Jews
Ukrainian prisoners and detainees
Ukrainian revolutionaries
Ukrainian trade unionists